Michael Slocombe (3 May 1941 – 30 August 2022) was an English professional footballer who played as a midfielder in the English Football League for Bristol Rovers.

Career
Slocombe signed his first professional contract with The Pirates in the summer of 1961 and made 32 appearances in two seasons with the club.

Later life and death
Following a leg break, Slocombe retired from football in 1990. He went on to work as a window cleaner as well as spending 25 years as a relief school caretaker for Bristol City Council. Slocombe died on 30 August 2022.

References

1941 births
2022 deaths
English footballers
Footballers from Bristol
Association football midfielders
Bristol Rovers F.C. players
Welton Rovers F.C. players
Bath City F.C. players